The Renaissance egg is a jewelled agate Easter egg made by Michael Perchin under the supervision of the Russian jeweller Peter Carl Fabergé in 1894. The egg was made for Alexander III of Russia, who presented it to his wife, the Empress Maria Feodorovna.

It was the last Fabergé egg that Alexander presented to Maria.

Surprise
The surprise is lost, but it has been speculated that the surprise was pearls. Another theory, advanced by Christopher Forbes, is that the surprise for the Renaissance egg is the Resurrection egg, which perfectly fits the curvature of the Renaissance egg's shell and has a similar decoration in enamel on the base. It was also shown at the same 1902 showcase as the Renaissance egg. The Resurrection egg has no inventory number, which would speak in favour of this theory.

History
Alexander III was billed 4,750 rubles for the Renaissance egg, and it was confiscated by the Russian Provisional Government in 1917. It was sold alongside nine other eggs for 1,500 rubles to Armand Hammer.

Advertised for sale by Hammer in 1937, it was sold to Henry Talbot DeVere Clifton. It had been sold in November 1949 to the Swingline magnates Jack and Belle Linsky.

Attempting to give their Fabergé collection to the Metropolitan Museum, the Linskys were rebuffed, as the museum stated it was not interested in "Edwardian decorative trivia". The egg was then sold to the Manhattan antique dealers A La Vieille Russie, where it was purchased by Malcolm Forbes for his collection on May 15, 1965.

The Forbes Collection was sold in 2004 to Russian oligarch Viktor Vekselberg. Vekselberg purchased some nine Imperial eggs as part of the collection for almost $100 million.

References

Sources

External links

A detailed article on the 'Renaissance' Egg, from imperialtresuresofrussia.com

Imperial Fabergé eggs
1894 works
Fabergé Museum in Saint Petersburg, Russia